Majidabad (also Romanized as Majīdābād) is a village in Ebrahimabad Rural District, Ramand District, Buin Zahra County, Qazvin Province, Iran. At the 2006 census, its population was 502, in 117 families.

References 

Populated places in Buin Zahra County